Frederick House or Fredericks House may refer to:

United States 
(by state)
Fredericks House (Prescott, Arizona)
Frederick House (Covington, Louisiana), listed on the National Register of Historic Places in St. Tammany Parish, Louisiana
Fredericks House (Fayson Lakes, New Jersey), listed on the National Register of Historic Places in Morris County, New Jersey

Canada 
Frederick House River,  a lake and trading post

People with the surname 
Fred House (born 1978), American basketball player

House, Frederick